The 12th (Eastern) Division was an infantry division raised by the British Army during the First World War from men volunteering for Kitchener's New Armies. The division saw service in the trenches of the Western Front from June 1915 to the end of the war.

Formation and First World War 

The 12th (Eastern) Division, was one of the first Kitchener's Army divisions raised from volunteers by Lord Kitchener. It was formed within Eastern Command as a result of Army Order No. 324 of 21 August 1914, as part of the K1 wave of divisions. It fought on the Western Front for the duration of the First World War. One of its most notable actions was the Battle of Épehy where there is a memorial cross to the 12th Division.

In the First World War, the division's insignia was the Ace of Spades, which has since been adopted by the present 12th Armoured Infantry Brigade.

Order of Battle 
35th Brigade

 7th (Service) Battalion, Norfolk Regiment
 7th (Service) Battalion, Suffolk Regiment (left May 1918)
 9th (Service) Battalion, Essex Regiment
 5th (Service) Battalion, Princess Charlotte of Wales's (Royal Berkshire Regiment) (transferred to 36th Brigade February 1918)
 1/1st Territorial Force (T.F.) Battalion, Cambridgeshire Regiment (joined May 1918)
 35th Machine Gun Company, Machine Gun Corps (formed 1 February 1916, moved to 12th Battalion, Machine Gun Corps (M.G.C.) 1 March 1918)
 35th Trench Mortar Battery (formed 25 June 1916)

36th Brigade

 8th (Service) Battalion, Royal Fusiliers (City of London Regiment) (disbanded February 1918)
 9th (Service) Battalion, Royal Fusiliers (City of London Regiment)
 7th (Service) Battalion, Royal Sussex Regiment
 11th (Service) Battalion, Duke of Cambridge's Own (Middlesex Regiment) (disbanded February 1918)
 5th (Service) Battalion, Princess Charlotte of Wales's (Royal Berkshire Regiment) (transferred from 35th Brigade February 1918)
 36th Machine Gun Company, Machine Gun Corps (formed 1 February 1916, moved to 12th Battalion, M.G.C. 1 March 1918)
 36th Trench Mortar Battery (formed 15 June 1916)

37th Brigade

 6th (Service) Battalion, Queen's (Royal West Surrey Regiment)
 6th (Service) Battalion, Buffs (East Kent Regiment)
 7th (Service) Battalion, East Surrey Regiment (disbanded February 1918)
 6th (Service) Battalion, Queen's Own (Royal West Kent Regiment)
 37th Machine Gun Company, Machine Gun Corps (formed 4 February 1916, moved to 12th Battalion, M.G.C. 1 March 1918)
 37th Trench Mortar Battery (formed 15 June 1916)

Divisional Troops
 5th (Service) Battalion, Northamptonshire Regiment (division pioneers)
 9 Motor Machine Gun Battery (joined early 1915, left 20 June 1915)
 235th Machine Gun Company (joined 16 July 1917, left to move into 12th Battalion M.G. C. 1 March 1918)
 12th Battalion Machine Gun Corps (formed 1 March 1918, absorbing the brigade MG companies)
 Divisional Mounted Troops
 A Squadron, King Edward's Horse (joined April 1915, left June 1916)
 12th Divisional Cyclist Company, Army Cyclist Corps (left 15 June 1916)
 12th Divisional Train Army Service Corps
 116th, 117th, 118th and 119th Companies
 23rd Mobile Veterinary Section Army Veterinary Corps
 214th Divisional Employment Company (joined 16 June 1917)

Royal Artillery
 LXII Brigade, Royal Field Artillery (R.F.A.)
 LXIII Brigade, R.F.A.
 LXIV Brigade, R.F.A. (left 6 January 1917)
 LXV (Howitzer) Brigade, R.F.A. (broken up 30 August 1916)
 12th Divisional Ammunition Column R.F.A.
 12th Heavy Battery, Royal Garrison Artillery (left 8 June 1915)
 V.12 Heavy Trench Mortar Battery R.F.A. (joined 31 July 1916, disbanded 12 February 1918)
 X.12, Y.12 and Z.12 Medium Mortar Batteries R.F.A. (formed 1 July 1916; on 16 February 1918, Z broken up distributed among X and Y batteries)

Royal Engineers
 69th Field Company
 70th Field Company
 87th Field Company (joined January 1915)
 12th Divisional Signals Company

Royal Army Medical Corps
 36th Field Ambulance
 37th Field Ambulance
 38th Field Ambulance
 23rd Sanitary Section (left 1 April 1917)

General Officer Commanding 

 Major-General James Spens 24 August 1914 – 15 March 1915
 Major-General Frederick D.V. Wing 15 March – 2 October 1915
 Brigadier-General W. K. McLeod 2–3 October 1915 (acting)
 Major-General Arthur B. Scott 3 October 1915 – 26 April 1918
 Major-General H. W. Higginson 26 April 1918 –

See also 

 List of British divisions in World War I

Notes

References

Bibliography 
 
 Ian F.W. Beckett, 'Territorials: A Century of Service,' First Published April 2008 by DRA Printing of 14 Mary Seacole Road, The Millfields, Plymouth PL1 3JY on behalf of TA 100, .
 Cliff Lord & Graham Watson, Royal Corps of Signals: Unit Histories of the Corps (1920–2001) and its Antecedents, Solihull: Helion, 2003, .
 Col L.F. Morling, Sussex Sappers: A History of the Sussex Volunteer and Territorial Army Royal Engineer Units from 1890 to 1967, Seaford: 208th Field Co, RE/Christians–W.J. Offord, 1972.
 Graham E. Watson & Richard A. Rinaldi, The Corps of Royal Engineers: Organization and Units 1889–2018, Tiger Lily Books, 2018, .

External links 
 Source for level of Training of 12th Inf.Div.
 

Infantry divisions of the British Army in World War I
Kitchener's Army divisions
Military units and formations established in 1914
1914 establishments in the United Kingdom